Ligonier Valley School District is a public school district in Westmoreland County, Pennsylvania. The boroughs of Ligonier, Laurel Mountain, Bolivar, Seward, New Florence, as well as the townships of Cook, St. Clair, Ligonier, and Fairfield are within district boundaries.

Schools

Elementary schools
 R.K. Mellon Elementary School (Grades Pre-K-5)
 Laurel Valley Elementary School (Grades Pre-K-5)

Middle school
 Ligonier Valley Middle School (Grades 6–8)

High school
 Ligonier Valley High School (Grades 9–12)

Vocational Technical School 
Students in Grades 10–12 at the district's high school have the opportunity to attend the Eastern Westmoreland Career and Technology Center in Derry Township.

Athletic Conference
Prior to the 2019-20 School year, Ligonier Valley School District was a member of PIAA District VI and the Heritage Conference. Beginning as of the 2020-21 School year, the district is now a member of PIAA District VII and WPIAL

External links 
 Ligonier Valley School District
 http://filter.lvsd.k12.pa.us

School districts in Westmoreland County, Pennsylvania